Autoclasica is an elegance competition for classic and vintage cars. It has taken place every year since 1998 during the first weekend of October in San Isidro, Buenos Aires, Argentina.
The event is the largest in South America, with more than 600 vehicles on display.

The show takes place the first week of October at the Hipódromo de San Isidro gardens, organized by the Club de Automoviles Clasicos (CAC), of Argentina.

Best of Show

References

External links
Official Site
Official Facebook

Automotive events
Concours d'Elegance
Auto shows